Kharqan may refer to:
 Kharqan District, in Markazi Province, Iran
 Kharqan Rural District (disambiguation)